Glycogenase may refer to one of two enzymes:
A-amylase
B-amylase